Bironella is one of the three mosquito genera in the subfamily Anophelinae. The other two genera are Anopheles Meigen (nearly worldwide distribution) and Chagasia Cruz (Neotropics).

Bironella is found in Australia but one species B. obscura is found in New Guinea.

The genus comprises 8 described species. It has been divided into three subgenera: Bironella Theobald (two species), Brugella Edwards (three species) and Neobironella Tenorio (three species).

Bironella appears to be the sister taxon to the Anopheles, with Chagasia forming the outgroup in this subfamily.

See also 
 List of mosquito genera
 Taxonomy of Anopheles

Notes 
 Bironella derooki is a synonym of Anopheles soesiloi.

References 

 Belkin, J. N. 1962. The Mosquitoes of the South Pacific (Diptera: Culicidae). Volume 1. University of California Press, 608 pp.
 Bonne-Wepster, J. and N. H. Swellengrebel. 1953. The Anopheline Mosquitoes of the Indo-Australian Region. Amsterdam, 504 pp.
 Edwards, F. W. 1932. Genera Insectorum. Diptera. Family Culicidae. Fascicle 194. Belgium, 258 pp.
 Evenhuis, N. L. and S. M. Gon III. 1989. Family Culicidae, pp. 191–218. In: N. L. Evenhuis (ed.), Catalog of the Diptera of the Australasian and Oceanian regions. Bishop Museum Special Publication 867. Bishop Museum Press, Honolulu.
 Tenorio, J. A. 1977. Revision of the genus Bironella (Diptera: Culicidae). Journal of Medical Entomology 14: 317-361.
 Theobald, F. V. 1905. A catalogue of the Culicidae in the Hungarian National Museum, with descriptions of new genera and species. Annales Historico-Naturales Musei Nationalis Hungarici 3: 61-120.
 Bironella (Brugella) obscura, a new species of mosquito from New Guinea (Diptera: Culicidae). Tenorio JA, J Med Entomol. 1975 Jan 10;11(6):734-8.,

External links 
 

Anophelinae
Mosquito genera
Taxa named by Frederick Vincent Theobald